Nicolás Kicker (born 16 August 1992 in Merlo) is an Argentine tennis player. He plays mainly on the ATP Challenger Tour. Kicker achieved his highest career singles ranking of 78 in June 2017. He has won 3 singles titles, and 1 doubles title on the  ATP Challenger Tour, but also 14 singles titles, and 7 doubles titles on the ITF Men's Circuit.

Career
His best Grand Slam result is reaching the third round of the 2018 Australian Open where he played against Márton Fucsovics.

In 2018, Kicker was suspended for six years and fined $25,000 for committing match-fixing offences under the Tennis Anti-Corruption Program. He was banned from professional tennis until January 2021.

Challenger and Futures titles

Singles titles: 18

See also
Match fixing in tennis
International Tennis Integrity Agency

References

External links
 
 

1992 births
Living people
Argentine male tennis players
Tennis controversies
Match fixers
Match fixing in tennis
Sportspeople from Buenos Aires Province